Franz Anton Voegeli (1825–1874) was a Swiss chemist who was the first to synthesize  triethyl phosphate (TEP) while he was working in Gustav Magnus's laboratory in Berlin.

References

1825 births
1874 deaths
Swiss chemists